Reign Through Immortality is the second studio album by Canadian heavy metal band Erimha. The album was released on July 8, 2013 through Victory Records, and was produced by Chris Donaldson.

Track listing

Personnel
 Erimha
Gore – vocals
Kthien – guitars
Dlusternas – guitars
Ksaos – drums

 Additional musicians
Christian Donaldson – bass
Jonathan Lefrancois-Leduc – orchestration
Fred Malizia – orchestration

 Production
Christian Donaldson – producer, engineer, mixing, mastering

References 

2013 albums
Erimha albums